Peter Drozd (born 12 November 1973) is a former Czech football player who played for several Czech clubs, most notably FC Baník Ostrava.

Drozd was a member of the squad of Baník Ostrava in the 2003-2004 season, when Baník won the league title.

Footnotes

References
 
 
 
 Opavský a hlučínský Deník: Peter Drozd bude na jaře hrát za Kubinovy Janovice

Czech footballers
Czechoslovakia under-21 international footballers
Czechoslovak footballers
Czech First League players
FC Baník Ostrava players
FC Hradec Králové players
MŠK Žilina players
SK Kladno players
Slovak Super Liga players
1973 births
Living people
Association football defenders
Czech people of Slovak descent